Kaan Önder, (born 10 January 1997 in Istanbul) is a former Turkish race driver. He was mentored by triple world champion Andy Priaulx in 2014 and 2015.

He holds titles of CIK SEEKZ (South East European Karting Zone) KF3 champion (2010), two times Turkish Karting Championship champion (KF3 in 2009 and ICA-J in 2008) and winner of the Rotax Max International Open Junior Category in 2011. He is the youngest Turkish race driver who attended the FIA ETCC in 2014.

As of 2016 season he is inactive retired from the motorsport stage to progress with his interest in Mathematics and Physics. As of 2019 this study is taking place at the University of Cambridge in the UK. He is a PhD candidate in the High Energy Physics group at DAMTP and a Downing College member. He is supervised by Prof. David Tong and his current research focus is on chiral fermions on the lattice.

Racing career 

Kaan's motorsports career started in 2007 with TOSFED's PO Cup project and he participated over 400 races and is the 1st Turkish driver to follow whole European Rotax Max Championship season in 2010. Kaan also raced for British Super 1 Championship, Belgian Championship, BNL Series, SEEKZ (South East European Karting Championship), and many other international trophies and race events.

He is the first Turkish kart driver who holds champion title at an international level and awarded as national sportsman in 2010.

Borusan Otomotiv and Castrol Turkey started to support him during 2010.

In 2013 he raced for the Formula BMW Talent Cup  series which is organized by BMW Motorsport and in 2014 he joined Borusan Otomotiv Motorsport ETCC team for the 2014 European Touring Car Cup season.

During the season, he raced with team's’s BMW 320si car in the Super 2000 TC2 class.

Karting

Mini / Cadet

Kaan began karting in 2007 at the age of ten at Tuzla, Istanbul, Turkey and his first season raced for PO Cup, SEEKZ and Turkish mini Championships with Tony Rocky chassis and Parilla Swift engine. Also raced at Easykart Cadet class in N.Cyprus during the 2007 winter season.

Junior ( Rotax / ICA-J / KF3 )

From the Cadet ranks, he progressed through the Junior (ICA-J) in Turkey and Rotax Mini Max in the UK (2008).

In his 1st year he became the Turkish ICA-J 2008 Champion with 355 points: He is also the 1st International KF3 Winner for Turkey in Karting. In 2009 he got the KF3 Turkish Champion title with 275 points.

He won the 1st International Karting Championship for Turkey in 2010.

SEEKZ (South East European Karting Zone) KF3 2010 Champion title came in Haskovo Bulgaria. Kaan came to Haskovo as leader of the championship and also track record holder for KF3 after Greek and Romanian Rounds. His total 92 points brought him the S.E. European KF3 Champion title.

In 2011 he won the Rotax Max International Open Junior race in Zuera Spain on a Tony Kart run by UK based Protrain Racing Team.

Formula BMW Talent Cup 
During 2011 and 2012 Kaan had his first Formula BMW tests in Circuit Ricardo Tormo Spain and Lausitzring Germany. His team Borusan Otomotiv Motorsport and sponsor Castrol Turkey supported him to race for the full 2013 Formula BMW Talent Cup season.

2013 season started with two test events in Spain and Sweden. Followed with test races in Austria, Slovakia and Hungary before the grand finals in Germany.

Kaan won two test races in Slovakia and Hungary and finished the last race of the season in Oschersleben on second place podium.

European Touring Car Cup (TC2)

Early 2014 Borusan Otomotiv Motorsport announced that 17-year-old Önder will drive the team's BMW 320si car for the 2014 European Touring Car Cup season. This was Kaan's 1st year with the touring cars and he had very limited testing opportunity with the BMW 320 si. Kaan had his debut at Circuit Paul Ricard  and had to compete with very experienced drivers. Last race of the ETCC 2014 season was in Autodromo di Pergusa in Italy and Onder managed to finish on the podium.

Audi Sport TT Cup

Önder raced for the 2015 Audi Sport TT Cup season which was the inaugural season of the Audi Sport TT Cup. It began on 2 May 2015 at Hockenheim and finished on 18 October at Hockenheim after six double-header meetings, all of which are support events for the Deutsche Tourenwagen Masters.

References

External links

 
 
 Borusan Otomotiv Motorsport

1997 births
Living people
Sportspeople from Istanbul
Turkish racing drivers
European Touring Car Cup drivers
Audi Sport TT Cup drivers
Formula BMW drivers